Dr. G. Glenn Lipscomb is a professor of chemical engineering at the University of Toledo. He served as department chair from 2004 to 2019. Additionally, he is a fellow of the American Institute of Chemical Engineers. He received his BS in chemical engineering from the University of Missouri-Rolla in 1981, and his Ph.D. from the University of California, Berkeley. He has a large volume of academic work including journals, conference proceedings, and patents.

References

External links 
 AIChe, Glenn Lipscomb

Living people
Year of birth missing (living people)
American chemical engineers
University of Toledo faculty
Missouri University of Science and Technology alumni
UC Berkeley College of Chemistry alumni
Fellows of the American Institute of Chemical Engineers